Eamon Rice (26 April 1873 – 7 November 1937) was an Irish Fianna Fáil politician. A national school teacher, he married Bridget Heneghan on 1 September 1914, and they had four children.

He was first elected to Dáil Éireann as a Fianna Fáil Teachta Dála (TD) at the 1932 general election for the Monaghan constituency. He was re-elected at the 1933 and 1937 general elections. He died while still in office in 1937. No by-election was held to fill his seat, but his widow Bridget Rice was elected as a TD for the same constituency from 1938 to 1954.

See also
Families in the Oireachtas

References

1873 births
1937 deaths
Fianna Fáil TDs
Irish schoolteachers
Members of the 7th Dáil
Members of the 8th Dáil
Members of the 9th Dáil
Spouses of Irish politicians